Kharupetia (IPA: ˌkɑːrʊˈpiːtɪə) (also spelt 'Kharupatia') is a town and a municipal board in Darrang district in the Indian state of Assam. Kharupetia is a fast-developing commercial town in Mangaldoi Sub-Division under Darrang District. It is about 17 km from Mangaldoi, the District headquarters and 87 km from Guwahati, the gateway of North East region. It is connected by National Highway 15.

The town exports fresh vegetables, fish and staples across Assam and other parts of India. Majority of the people living here are engaged in business activities. It is famous as a business centre in Assam.

Geography
Kharupetia is located at .Falling Rain Genomics, Inc - Kharupetia It has an average elevation of 37 metres (121 feet).

Tourist spots 
 Niz Kharupetia Pond 
 Samshan Kali Mandir
 Shiv Mandir
 Satsangha Vihar at Netaji Nagar
 Sri Sri Ramkrishna Sevashram
 Jagatbandhu Dham, Natunpatty
 Hindu Milan Mandir
 Jain Mandir, M B Road
 Hanuman Mandir, M B Road
 Jame Masjid, Main Road
 Hospital Road
 Barowari Durga Mandir

Colleges and schools

Colleges
 Kharupetia College
 S.M. College
 B.L.G College
 Oxford Academy
 United Stars Academy
 Ajmal College of Arts, Commerce and Science
Schools
 Kharupetia Girls High School
 Kharupetia Higher Secondary School
 Saila bala High School
 Tapoban Bengali School
 Adarsh Hindi Vidhyalaya
There are many private English Medium Schools in Kharupetia Town:
Morning Star Engilish High School
 Luit Valley High School
 Sunflower Engilish High School
 Sarada Vidya Mandir
 Royal Academy Kharupetia

Others 
 Nearest Railway station: Rowta Bagan railway station (29km approx.)
 Nearest Police station: Kharupetia
 Nearest International Airport: Lokpriya Gopinath Bordoloi International Airport, Borjhar, Guwahati (89km approx.)
 Nearest Domestic Airport: Tezpur Airport (89km approx.)
 Hospital: Kharupetia Civil Hospital (thirty bedded government hospital)
 Major Festivals: Bihu, Durga Puja, Eid, Deepawali, Holi etc.''

Demographics
 India census, Kharupetia had a population of 17,784. Males constitute 54% of the population and females 46%. Kharupetia has an average literacy rate of 73%, higher than the national average of 59.5%: male literacy is 78%, and female literacy is 68%. In Kharupetia, 12% of the population is under 6 years of age.

According to 2011 census, Kharupetia has a population of 18,501, of which 9764 are males & 8737 are females. Children (0-6) constitute 9.82% of the town's population. Female sex ratio of Kharupetia is 895 females per thousand males (less than the state's average). Literacy rate is 83.66% (male 88.87%, female 77.78%).

Almost the entire population is Bengali , with a few Marwadis, Biharis, Nepalis and Assamese. Hindus form the majority in the town (78.71%) followed by Muslims and Jains.

References

Cities and towns in Darrang district
Darrang district